Madison Avenue was an Australian electronic music duo consisting of writer-producer Andy Van Dorsselaer and singer-lyricist Cheyne Coates. Madison Avenue is best known for the song "Don't Call Me Baby" (October 1999), which peaked at number two on the ARIA Singles Chart in 1999 and topped the charts in New Zealand and the United Kingdom in 2000. At the ARIA Music Awards of 2000 they won Single of the Year, Highest Selling Single and Breakthrough Artist – Single for "Don't Call Me Baby" as well as Best Video for Mark Hartley's direction of "Who the Hell Are You".

History

Before joining Madison Avenue, Cheyne Coates was working as a choreographer and singer in Melbourne. Coates met producer and writer Andy Van Dorsselaer (aka Andy Van) in a dance club. Van was the founder of the Vicious Vinyl record label and had remix credits for Tina Arena and CDB. Van Dorsselaer had won an Australian Recording Industry Association (ARIA) award for his production work on "Coma" by Pendulum.

The duo started working together mainly as writers and producers in 1998. Madison Avenue recorded their first single, "Fly", featuring Kellie Wolfgram as lead vocalist. Coates sang lead on the group's breakthrough single, "Don't Call Me Baby" (October 1999): Van Dorsselaer preferred her version, even though it was initially used as the guide track for Wolfgram. "Don't Call Me Baby" peaked at number two on the ARIA Singles Chart in 1999. By December 2000 it was certified as triple platinum for the shipment of 210,000 units in Australia. The single was released internationally in 2000. In New Zealand, "Don't Call Me Baby" topped the New Zealand Singles Chart in April 2000. In the United Kingdom, the single topped the UK Singles Chart in May 2000, selling 400,000 copies in Britain. The song was also a top ten hit in Greece and Ireland. Coates became the public face of the band, although they had intended to be a collective dance group like C&C Music Factory or Soul II Soul.

The group's only studio album, The Polyester Embassy, was released in 2000 and reached number 4 on the Australian album charts. It provided three other singles: "Who the Hell Are You?", a number-one hit in Australia, "Everything You Need", and "Reminiscing", a cover version of the 1978 hit written by Graeham Goble for the Little River Band. At the ARIA Music Awards of 2000 they won Single of the Year, Highest Selling Single and Breakthrough Artist – Single for "Don't Call Me Baby" as well as Best Video for Mark Hartley's direction of "Who the Hell Are You". They were also nominated for Best Group, Best Dance Release, Producer of the Year (for work by Van Dorsselaer and Coates) and Best Video (for direction by Hartley) for "Don't Call Me Baby". Madison Avenue won the Best Dance Artist award at the International Dance Awards in 2001 in Miami.

Madison Avenue broke up in 2003. In April 2004, Coates issued her debut solo single, "I've Got Your Number". She followed with a solo album, Something Wicked This Way Comes (October 2004). Soon after, she left the music performance industry and, according to Van Dorseelaer, "has a successful career writing songs for other people." Andy Van went on to create the band Vandalism.

Personnel

 Cheyne Coates – vocals and lyrics
 Andy Van Dorsselaer – producer and writer

Discography

Studio albums

Mix albums

Ministry of Sound: The Summer Annual – Summer 2000 (CD2)

Singles

Awards and nominations

ARIA Music Awards
The ARIA Music Awards is an annual awards ceremony that recognises excellence, innovation, and achievement across all genres of Australian music. They commenced in 1987.

! 
|-
|rowspan="8"|2000
|rowspan="5"| "Don't Call Me Baby"
| ARIA Award for Breakthrough Artist - Single
| 
|rowspan="8"|
|-
| ARIA Award for Single of the Year
| 
|-
| ARIA Award for Highest Selling Single
| 
|-
| ARIA Award for Best Group
| 
|-
| ARIA Award for Best Dance Release
| 
|-
| Andy Van, Cheyne Coates for "Don't Call Me Baby"
| ARIA Award for Producer of the Year
| 
|-
| Mark Hartley for "Don't Call Me Baby"
|rowspan="2"| ARIA Award for Best Video
| 
|-
| Mark Hartley for "Who the Hell Are You"
| 
|-
|2001
| The Polyester Embassy
| ARIA Award for Best Pop Release
| 
|

See also
 List of number-one dance hits (United States)
 List of artists who reached number one on the U.S. dance chart
 List of artists who reached number one on the Australian singles chart

References

External links
 

Musical groups established in 1999
Australian pop music groups
Australian electronic music groups
Victoria (Australia) musical groups
Australian house music groups
ARIA Award winners
Australian musical duos
Electronic dance music duos
Male–female musical duos
Musical groups disestablished in 2003
1999 establishments in Australia
Musical groups from Melbourne